Bob Dermer (born 1946) is a Canadian actor who first made his contributions to Canadian television in 1965 as an actor in Ottawa on a late night serial called Milk and Honey which ran for 200 episodes.
Prior to Readalong, Dermer was also on several Canadian children's shows such as Hi Diddle Day which ran for 10 years on the CBC followed by Pencil Box which ran for another six years.

Early life 
Dermer was born in Ottawa, Ontario.

Career 
In the 1980s, Dermer appeared on the children's show Today's Special, playing a puppet character named Sam Crenshaw, and starred in the animated Raccoons series and specials as Ralph Raccoon (and various other characters.) He was the voice of Grumpy Bear in the Care Bears films and TV series of that era. In the middle of airing Today's Special in 1984, Dermer was nearly killed in a car accident and suffered from a broken clavicle and thoracic ribs and lost his left eye. He was unable to perform for five months and had to wear an eye patch before having an eyeball transplant.

Later on, he would make a cameo appearance in Walt Disney Pictures's 1994 film The Santa Clause, before making one final foray in the 1996 made-for-TV movie Hostile Advances: The Kerry Ellison Story. He retired from the TV business in 2001.

Filmography

Film

Television

References

External links

1946 births
Living people
Canadian male voice actors
Canadian puppeteers